Judi Leinweber (born 13 June 1950) is a Canadian former alpine skier who competed in the 1968 Winter Olympics.

References

1950 births
Living people
Canadian female alpine skiers
Olympic alpine skiers of Canada
Alpine skiers at the 1968 Winter Olympics
Sportspeople from British Columbia